Born to Defence is a 1986 Hong Kong action film, which marked the directorial debut of Jet Li, who also stars in the film. The film features fight choreography by Tsui Siu-Ming. The film is set in China following the end of World War II and the liberation of China. Li stars as an avid athlete who encounters conflicts with American navy sailors, primarily in the boxing ring.

Plot
Jet (Jet Li) returns to his hometown of Qingdao after the fighting the Japanese. He and his fellow soldiers discover that much has changed since the end of the war, and American soldiers are taking all the glory for the victory achieved, and they feel unappreciated. Jet eventually meets with his old friend Zhang (Zhao Erkang), a fellow soldier who saved Jet's life in battle, but was seriously injured with shrapnel. Zhao makes a living as a rickshaw driver. Jet decides to stay at Zhao's house for a while. Jet asks Zhang about his daughter. Zhang replies that she died.

One day, an American Navy Captain named Hans (Kurt Roland Petersson) is driving recklessly through Qingdao's streets, causing a mob to become angry and surround his car. Jet and Hans fight briefly, with Hans being impressed with Jet. The angry mob proceeds to burn his car, causing a riot. Jet and his fellow band of soldiers and rickshaw-drivers retreat during the chaos to a bar, which they discover now caters primarily to foreigners with a boxing ring and is frequented by prostitutes. Jet and his friends are angry at the insults hurled at them by American Navy patrons, which leads to an American soldier named Bailey (Paulo Tocha) challenging Jet to a formal boxing match.

During the match, Jet struggles with only being allowed to use his fists, and frequently breaks the rules due to his ignorance of American boxing. Frustrated, Jet attempts to leave the ring, but Bailey kicks him to prevent him from leaving. Jet continues the fight using both kung-fu and boxing techniques, and even demonstrates that he has finally adapted to boxing and shows superiority over Bailey. Jet wins the fight, along with a lot of money, and the Chinese in the crowd are proud of him.

Later, Bailey and a Chinese prostitute (Song Jia) approach Zhang for a rickshaw ride. The woman is apprehensive around Zhang, and pleads with Bailey to go home. Bailey, furious at Zhang's slow speed and at the fact that the woman keeps staring at Zhang, repeatedly kicks Zhang to make him go faster. Furious, Zhang tips over his rickshaw and insults the woman, causing her to leave in tears. Bailey assaults Zhang, leaving him severely injured. Jet takes over for Zhang's rickshaw. After one of his rickshaw trips, the American soldiers (led by Bailey) deliberately destroy his rickshaw, forcing Jet to take a job at the bar where he fought Bailey the other day. The job requires Jet to be a "sparring partner" for Bailey, where he cannot fight back and must sustain many blows. When Jet initially refuses, the soldiers threaten to beat the bar-owner. Seeing no other way, Jet reluctantly agrees to be Bailey's sparring partner. The prostitute, named Rui (or "Na"), approaches Jet and informs him that the bar-owner was actually a part of the scheme to force Jet to be a sparring partner. Captain Hans attacks Bailey for paying the bar-owner of the scheme, putting a shame to the Navy.

Jet returns to the bar the next day with the intent of fighting back against Bailey (regardless of the consequences to the bar and the bar owner). However, Jet learns that he will be fighting Captain Hans instead. Hans goads Jet into a formal fighting match. The match goes on for a long time, which eventually leads to chaos in the bar as crowds of Chinese and American soldiers fight each other until American soldiers to come and enforce order. The match basically ends in a draw, with Jet barely able to stand. Rui takes Jet to her house, removes his wet clothes to prevent him from catching pneumonia, and helps him rest and recover.

Later, Rui approaches Zhang at the hospital to inform him of what happened to Jet. When he sees that Jet is naked in the bed, he is furious and hits Rui. He reveals to Jet that Rui is his daughter and that he is ashamed of her because she's a prostitute. Jet pleads with him to change his mind about his daughter but Zhang only gets more furious, and angrily tells Jet to find another place to stay.

Later, Jet comes back to Zhang's house, and gleefully tells him that he fell in love with a girl after Zhang kicked him out. However, he asks Zhang for advice: if his new girlfriend is a prostitute, but promises to quit, should he give her a chance? Zhang tells him that he should. Jet then offers to introduce him to his girlfriend right away. The "girlfriend", it turns out, is Rui herself. Zhang is initially angry at Jet and Rui's deception, but Jet makes them reconcile, and they do. While Rui goes out to buy some food and wine, the American soldiers kidnap Rui. Jet and Zhang are informed of this by local rickshaw drivers. While looking for Rui, Jet is confronted by Hans, who wishes to continue the fight from the other night. The Navy soldiers eventually throw both Rui and Zhang off the roof, killing them both. Captain Hans appears shocked and angry at what they've done.

While in jail, Jet is severely beaten by the local police for "causing trouble," and the American soldiers are let go. Jet is furious. Later, he escapes from jail by tying a wet shirt against two loose bars. He later finds the American soldiers (with Captain Hans and Bailey) driving by a warehouse. Jet sets a trap that forces them to stop. He lights their car on fire with a molotov cocktail and lures them into the warehouse. He severely injures one of the soldiers and ties up another one to the ceiling. Jet then finds Bailey and traps him on a conveyor belt that leads to a furnace, where he burns Bailey to death. Then, he confronts Hans. Hans and Jet fight for a long time. Hans eventually gains the upper hand, but their movements cause the mechanisms of the warehouse to eventually knock a bunch of barrels into Hans. With Hans severely beaten on the ground, Jet picks up an axe, screams, and swings it downward. He chooses to spare Hans. Hans is relieved. Jet walks out of the warehouse.

Cast
Jet Li as Jet
Zhao Erkang as Zhang 
Song Jia as Na 
Kurt Roland Petersson as Captain Hans 
Paulo Tocha as Bailey 
Yuen Fai as Friend of Jet
Lam Hak-ming as Policeman
Cho Wing as Angry Chinese Man
Dion Lam as Angry Chinese Man
Ng Kit-keung as Angry Chinese Man
Mark King as GI Blue  
Dean Harrington as US Marine 
Yuen Kam-fai as Soldier
Zhang Chun-zhong as Soldier

Box office
In Hong Kong, the film grossed , making it the 38th top-grossing film of the year. This was considered a disappointing performance in Hong Kong.

In contrast, the film was a success in China, becoming the second-highest-grossing film of the year. It grossed  in box office revenue, and sold  tickets in China. This adds up to  grossed in China and Hong Kong in 1986.

In South Korea, the film sold 782 tickets in the capital city of Seoul.

See also
 Jet Li filmography
 List of Hong Kong films

References

External links

1986 films
1986 action films
1986 directorial debut films
1986 martial arts films
1980s Cantonese-language films
1980s English-language films
Films directed by Jet Li
Hong Kong action films
Hong Kong boxing films
Hong Kong martial arts films
Kung fu films
Hong Kong multilingual films
1986 multilingual films
1980s Hong Kong films